Africofusus ocelliferus, common name the long-siphoned whelk, is a species of sea snail, a marine gastropod mollusk in the family Fasciolariidae, the spindle snails, the tulip snails and their allies.

Spelling
The specific name was originally spelled "ocelliferus"; although this is not a correct latinization it is not liable to a justified emendation (cf. ICZN art. 32.5.1. "Incorrect transliteration or latinization ... are not to be considered inadvertent errors"). The spelling ocellifer is therefore an unjustified emendation, which may be traced to Kaicher, 1976 (card no 1857)

Description

Distribution
This marine species occurs off South Africa.

References

  Lamarck J.B. (1816). Liste des objets représentés dans les planches de cette livraison. In: Tableau encyclopédique et méthodique des trois règnes de la Nature. Mollusques et Polypes divers. Agasse, Paris. 16 pp.

External links
 Branch, G.M. et al. (2002). Two Oceans. 5th impression. David Philip, Cate Town & Johannesburg.
 Lamarck [J.B.P.A. de M. de]. (1816). Tableau encyclopédique et méthodique des trois règnes de la nature, Mollusques et polypes divers. Part 23 [Livraison 84, 14 December 1816], Tome 3, pp. 1–16, pls. 391-431, 431 bis, 431 bis*, 432-488, Paris: Vve Agasse
 Smith E.A. (1899). Descriptions of new species of South African marine shells. Journal of Conchology. 9: 247-252, pl. 5

ocelliferus
Gastropods described in 1816